Hausa may refer to:
 Hausa people, an ethnic group of West Africa
 Hausa language, spoken in West Africa
 Hausa Kingdoms, a historical collection of Hausa city-states
 Hausa (horse) or Dongola horse, an African breed of riding horse

See also
 
 Hausa music, the music of the Hausa people
 Kannywood or Hausa movies, the Hausa-language film industry of Northern Nigeria
 Xhosa (disambiguation)

Language and nationality disambiguation pages